31 Boys 5 Concepts is an EP by Produce X 101 contestants of the South Korean survival show Produce X 101. It was released online for download on July 5, 2019, by CJ E&M.

Background
Produce X 101 is a South Korean survival show that aired on Mnet where 101 male trainees from various entertainment companies competed to debut in an 11-member boy group.

On the 8th, 9th and 10th episode, the 31 remaining trainees were split into five teams and given five new songs from different producers, with different genres.

Commercial performance

Track listing

References

2019 compilation albums
K-pop EPs
Korean-language compilation albums
Produce 101